= Reza Lavassani =

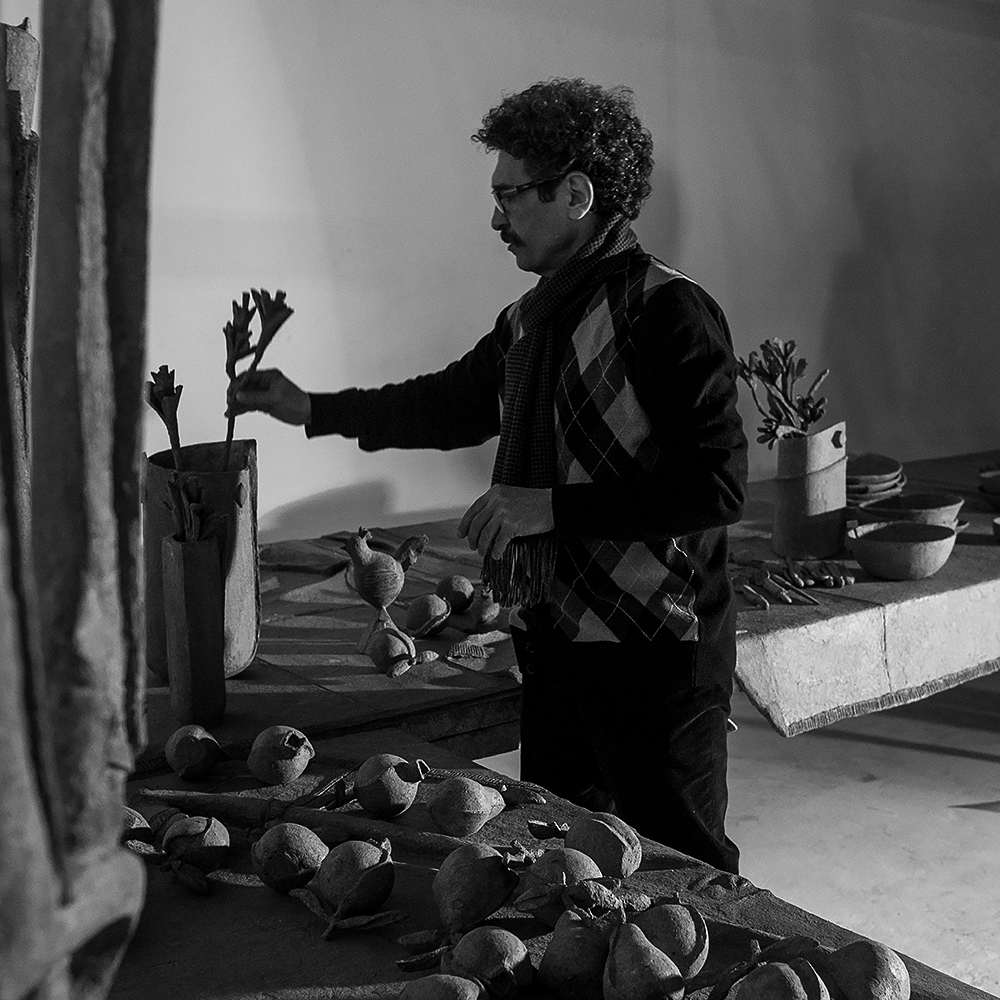
- Reza Lavasani with a part of "Life" Installation. 2014
- Born: 1962 (age 63–64); Iran
- Known for: Painting, Sculpture

Reza Lavassani (born 1962, Tehran, Iran) is an Iranian painter, sculptor, illustrator and stage designer. He is from the Lavasani family. He is known for his highly philosophical expressions in his artistic activities.

== Background ==
Lavassani was born in Tehran, Iran in 1962. He studied painting at the Faculty of Fine Arts, Tehran University, but felt after graduating that his degree had not been enough to put him on the 'true path of painting'. For this reason, he spent years studying philosophy in general and mysticism in particular, while being concerned with the basic meanings of mythology, sociology, religion, history, and so on.

== Works ==
Lavassani's paintings and sculptures readily betray his interest in universal symbols and mythological legends. Ancient symbols are recreated papier mâché to form horses, birds, trees etc. The same motifs appear in his paintings. The horse represents speed and nobility, the women fertility and of the sacred, the bird a messenger between heaven and earth. At the heart of his works, however, is this belief that modern life distances us from nature and reality.

== Exhibitions and awards ==
Lavassani has held numerous solo exhibitions in Tehran and has been subject of several national and international group exhibitions and art fairs. He has been the recipient of several awards including UNESCO's Noma Concourse in 2007 and 1994 and the first prize of Tehran's 4th Biennial of Sculpture and 6th Biennial of Illustration. His work has been featured in numerous publications both within and outside Iran, as well as part of several notable private collections.
